The Bogota Public Schools are a comprehensive community public school district serving students in kindergarten through twelfth grade from the Borough of Bogota in Bergen County, New Jersey, United States.

As of the 2018–19 school year, the district, comprised of three schools, had an enrollment of 1,135 students and 97.6 classroom teachers (on an FTE basis), for a student–teacher ratio of 11.6:1.

The district is classified by the New Jersey Department of Education as being in District Factor Group "DE", the fifth-highest of eight groupings. District Factor Groups organize districts statewide to allow comparison by common socioeconomic characteristics of the local districts. From lowest socioeconomic status to highest, the categories are A, B, CD, DE, FG, GH, I, and J.

Awards and recognition
Lillian M. Steen School was one of nine schools in New Jersey honored in 2020 by the National Blue Ribbon Schools Program, which recognizes high student achievement.

Schools 
Schools in the district (with 2018–19 enrollment data from the National Center for Education Statistics.) are:
E. Roy Bixby School with 286 students in grades K – 6
Damon J. Englese, Principal
Lillian M. Steen School which served 293 students in grades K – 6
Dayle Collins, Principal
Bogota High School with an enrollment of 520 students in grades 7 through 12
Kelly Foley DeCongelio, Principal

Administration 
Core members of the district's administration are:
Damian Kennedy, Superintendent of Schools
Irfan Evcil, Business Administrator / Board Secretary

Board of education
The district's board of education, comprised of nine members, sets policy and oversees the fiscal and educational operation of the district through its administration. As a Type II school district, the board's trustees are elected directly by voters to serve three-year terms of office on a staggered basis, with three seats up for election each year held (since 2012) as part of the November general election. The board appoints a superintendent to oversee the day-to-day operation of the district.

References

External links 
Bogota Public Schools

School Data for the Bogota Public Schools, National Center for Education Statistics

Bogota, New Jersey
New Jersey District Factor Group DE
School districts in Bergen County, New Jersey